Florentino Ibrain Morris Luís (born 19 August 1999), known as Florentino, is a Portuguese professional footballer who plays for Primeira Liga club Benfica as a defensive midfielder.

Coming through Benfica's youth system, he began playing for Benfica B in 2017 and was promoted to the first-team a year later, playing a few minutes with the latter. He joined Monaco and Getafe on consecutive loans between 2020 and 2022. He returned to Benfica the following season and established himself as an integral player for the club.

Florentino is a former Portugal youth international, representing his country at various levels, being part of the under-17 team that won the 2016 European Championship, the under-19 team that won the 2018 European Championship and the under-21 team that finished as runners-up at the 2021 European Championship.

Club career

Benfica

2017–2019: Early years
Born in Lisbon to Angolan parents, Florentino began playing futsal, with 8 years old at local club Tercena Futsal, before moving to football, after joining Real Massamá in 2009. The following year, he joined Benfica's youth system. On 11 September 2016, he made his professional debut with the club's reserve team as a substitute in a 2–1 home win over Académico de Viseu in LigaPro. During that season, Florentino played in the 2016–17 UEFA Youth League, in which he was a key part of Benfica reaching the final of the competition, which the club lost to Red Bull Salzburg 2–1 in the final and also won the 2017–18 Campeonato Nacional de Juniores.

Following his promotion to Benfica's first team alongside three other Benfica B players on 1 February 2019, Florentino made his Primeira Liga debut as a 62nd-minute substitute in a 10–0 thrashing of Nacional on 10 February. Four days later, he made his European debut as Benfica beat Galatasaray 2–1 in the first leg of the UEFA Europa League round of 32, their first ever victory in Turkey. Florentino scored his first Primeira Liga goal in a 4–0 away win over Moreirense on 17 March 2019. He helped Benfica win their record 37th league title by making 11 appearances (8 starts), featuring in a 4–1 win over Santa Clara on the final day of the league campaign. Despite being a starter under Bruno Lage, following his sacking, with the appointment of Jorge Jesus, Florentino lost his place in the first team and after failling to impress the new coach in pre-season, he requested his coach to be sent on loan, in order to have more game time.

2020–2022: Loans to Monaco and Getafe
On 25 September 2020, he joined Monaco on a season-long loan deal for the 2020–21 season, for a reported fee of €1.5 million, with an option to buy of €30 million. He made his debut on 4 October, replacing Youssouf Fofana in the 45th minute in the 1–0 away lost to Brest in Ligue 1. Despite contracting COVID-19 during the season, Flornetino found limited minutes, only making two starts in eleven appearances, which saw Monaco finish third place in the league.

On 31 August 2021, Florentino joined La Liga side Getafe on a season-long loan deal for a €500,000 with the Spanish club having an option to buy for €10 million. He made his debut for the club on 18 September, replacing Juan Iglesias in the 46th minute in the 3–0 lost to Rayo Vallecano. Florentino initially became a starter, being the club's best performing midfielder, but following the appointment of Quique Sánchez Flores, he eventually lost his place in the team, and was linked with a potential return to Benfica in January, before making a total of 24 appearances, including 8 starts, as Getafe nearly avoided relegation.

2022–2023: Return and First-team breakthrough
Following his loan spell at Getafe, Florentino returned to Benfica the following season. During the pre-season, he impressed newly arrived coach Roger Schmidt with his "quality and commitment", according to the new coach, leading him to earn a spot in the starting eleven, being entrusted by his new manager in the defensive midfield role, in Benfica's first win of the season on 2 August, starting in a 4–1 home win over Midtjylland in the first leg of the 2022–23 UEFA Champions League third qualifying round. He subsequently formed a successful partnership in midfield, with the club's newest signing Enzo Fernández, and in his next six matches he registered a 93% passing rate, 5 tackles per match and won 90% his duels, topping the Primeira Liga's defensive stats, including an assist for David Neres goal in Benfica's 5–0 home win over Marítimo on 18 September, after winning a duel. On 14 October, he agreed to a contract extension to 2027, increasing his buyout clause to €120 million.

International career
Florentino earned 84 caps and scored 1 goal for Portugal across all youth levels, starting with a 2–1 win for the under-15 team against Switzerland in Campo Maior on 10 June 2014. He went with the under-17 team to the 2016 UEFA European Championship in Azerbaijan, helping his team win over neighbours Spain in the final.

At the 2017 UEFA European Under-19 Championship in Georgia, Florentino was part of the Portugal team that finished runners-up to England. He was also in the squad for the following year's event, beating Italy 4–3 in the final after extra time, being named in the Team of the Tournament.

Florentino was named in the under-21 squad for the 2021 UEFA European Under-21 Championship. He was named for the team of the tournament as Portugal finished as runners-up after losing in the final 1–0 to Germany, on 6 June 2021.

In October 2022, he was named in Portugal's preliminary 55-man squad for the 2022 FIFA World Cup in Qatar.

Style of play
A combative and hard-working player, he usually played in front of his team's back-line, where he mainly served as a defensive foil for his more offensive teammates, due to his aggressive tackling, as well as his ability to read the game, break down plays, mark and anticipate opponents, and time his challenges. In this role, he connects the team by serving as a link player as the ball is circulated. He is known in for his positional sense, tactical discipline, intelligence, energy, and ball-winning ability. On top of his defensive prowess, Florentino is a composed passer with an excellent understanding of how to link attack and defence. He is highly accurate with his passing, upon receiving the ball, he is exceptional at analysing which pass is the best option based on the position of his teammates, the position and body shape of the defence and the spaces available. He uses various techniques to study his opponents moves before deciding to challenge for the ball. He tries to read his opponent’s body posture, the pressure he is under and what passing lanes he has so as to cut them off – before eventually dispossessing them. His playing style has led him to be compared to Claude Makélélé and N'Golo Kanté.

Personal life
Florentino became engaged to his childhood sweetheart, Bruna Guerreiro in 2020.

Career statistics

Club

Honours
Benfica
Primeira Liga: 2018–19
Supertaça Cândido de Oliveira: 2019
Campeonato Nacional de Juniores: 2017–18
UEFA Youth League runner-up: 2016–17

Portugal
UEFA European Under-17 Championship: 2016
UEFA European Under-19 Championship: 2018

Individual
UEFA European Under-17 Championship Team of the Tournament: 2016
UEFA European Under-19 Championship Team of the Tournament: 2018

References

External links

 profile at S.L. Benfica website
 
 
 National team data 

1999 births
Living people
Footballers from Lisbon
Portuguese sportspeople of Angolan descent
Portuguese footballers
Association football midfielders
Liga Portugal 2 players
Primeira Liga players
Ligue 1 players
S.L. Benfica B players
S.L. Benfica footballers
AS Monaco FC players
Getafe CF footballers
Portugal youth international footballers
Black Portuguese sportspeople
Portuguese expatriate footballers
Portuguese expatriate sportspeople in France
Portuguese expatriate sportspeople in Monaco
Portuguese expatriate sportspeople in Spain
Expatriate footballers in France
Expatriate footballers in Monaco
Expatriate footballers in Spain